Caernarvonshire was a constituency of the House of Commons of the Parliament of England, then of the Parliament of Great Britain from 1707 to 1800, and of the Parliament of the United Kingdom from 1801 to 1885 and from 1918 until 1950. It elected one Member of Parliament (MP) by the first past the post system.

Members of Parliament
Constituency created (1542)

MPs 1542–1604

MPs 1604–1950

Uncontested elections 1830–1865

Elections 1866–1885

Elections in the 1860s
Pennant was elevated to the peerage, becoming Lord Penrhyn, causing a by-election.

Elections in the 1870s

Elections in the 1880s

Williams resigned after being appointed a judge of the Queen's Bench Division of the High Court of Justice

Elections 1918–1945

Elections in the 1910s

Elections in the 1920s

Elections in the 1930s 

 Owen opposed the National Government

General Election 1939–40:

Another General Election was required to take place before the end of 1940. The political parties had been making preparations for an election to take place from 1939 and by the end of this year, the following candidates had been selected; 
Liberal: Goronwy Owen
Labour: Elwyn Jones

Elections in the 1940s

Sources
 

History of Caernarfonshire
Constituencies of the Parliament of the United Kingdom established in 1542
Historic parliamentary constituencies in North Wales
Constituencies of the Parliament of the United Kingdom disestablished in 1885
Constituencies of the Parliament of the United Kingdom established in 1918
Constituencies of the Parliament of the United Kingdom disestablished in 1950
Politics of Caernarfonshire